The 1974 Boise State Broncos football team represented Boise State University during the 1974 NCAA Division II football season, the seventh season of Bronco football (at the four-year level) and the second in the newly reorganized Division II. The Broncos were in their fifth year as members of the Big Sky Conference (and NCAA) and played their home games on campus at Bronco Stadium in Boise, Idaho. This was the first season as "BSU" as the school had recently become a university.

The only loss was by two points in-mid season at Las Vegas; the UNLV Rebels were led by running back Mike Thomas, a future NFL Rookie of the Year, and sophomore quarterback  They built a 31-point lead, then hung on as Boise State answered with four straight touchdown passes from senior  UNLV was undefeated until the Grantland Rice Bowl, the Division II semifinals.

Invited again to the eight-team Division II playoffs, BSU drew a road game in the quarterfinals at Central Michigan; the Chippewas won  and went on to win the national title. They moved up to Division I  joining the Mid-American Conference (MAC). In the regular season, the Broncos had scored at least 35 points in every game.

Following this season, Bronco Stadium was expanded with an upper deck added to the east grandstand, which increased the permanent seating capacity  Part of the original design, it had been delayed for five years due to high costs.

Schedule

Roster

All-conference
Six Broncos were named to the Big Sky all-conference team:

 Jim McMillan, QB, (unanimous); conference MVP (offense)
 Mike Holton, WR, (unanimous)
 Rolly Woolsey, S, (unanimous)
 Loren Schmidt, LB
 Ron Davis, LB
 Saia Misa, DT

Boise State also placed six players on the second team.

Quarterback McMillan was a first-team Little All-American; Holton, Woolsey, and Schmidt were honorable mention.

NFL Draft
Three Broncos were selected in the 1975 NFL Draft, which lasted seventeen rounds (442 selections).

References

External links
 Bronco Football Stats – 1974

Boise State
Boise State Broncos football seasons
Big Sky Conference football champion seasons
Boise State Broncos football